Kukersella is an extinct genus of bryozoan of the family Crownoporidae, known from the Ordovician period. Its colonies consist of cylindrical branches growing from an encrusting base.

Species

References

Prehistoric bryozoan genera
Cyclostomatida